Outreach Radio (formerly Lockdown FM) is a UK-based Independent Regional Radio station, broadcasting on DAB Digital Radio to Hampshire, the South Coast & the Isle of Wight, and until mid-March 2021 on 100.7 FM to Chandler's Ford, Eastleigh, North Baddesley, Romsey & Surrounding Areas.

History

The station was launched on May 16, 2020, during the first stay-at-home order lockdown period of the COVID-19 pandemic in the UK. Initially launching as an FM station (Lockdown FM). It broadcast under a temporary license granted by the Office of Communications to radio stations supporting local communities during the Coronavirus pandemic. During this period the station provided a mix of shows featuring recorded music, public service, and charity announcements in order to both entertain and offer support to the local communities of Chandlers Ford, Eastleigh, North Baddesley, Romsey and surrounding areas of Hampshire. In the ensuing months, a small roster of voluntary presenters was built-up.

In September 2020, the temporary FM licence expired, and the station (re-branded to Outreach Radio), continued online only. In November 2020, the station commenced broadcasting on the South Hampshire DAB multiplex. It was granted a second temporary FM license (for 100.7 MHz, again), during the second UK stay-at-home order. On August 16, 2021, the second license concluded, leaving Outreach Radio as a DAB only service.

On May 21, 2022, Outreach Radio ran its first event attracting local people with a past affinity to the former Southampton Ice Rink. This event was recorded and highlights broadcast the following day. A charity fundraiser comprising a raffle and auction took place at this event, in which £558 was raised for the Hampshire & Isle of Wight Air Ambulance service.

On June 30, 2022, Outreach Radio began their ongoing collaboration with Peter Symonds College in Winchester, establishing the student-led enrichment group: Symonds Radio. Members of Symonds Radio currently produce ad-hoc programming for Outreach Radio, and are currently in the process of trying to raise their own internal budget to develop a small live radio studio for Symonds Radio to operate independently and still collaborate with Outreach Radio in the future.

Following the launch of the Winchester small-scale DAB multiplex in October 2022, Outreach Radio's sister station, Outreach Dance, became available on DAB+ for listeners in Winchester and surrounding areas.

On November 15, 2022, Outreach Radio became the Official Media Sponsor for Westquay On Ice, providing live music and broadcasts from the ice rink from November 15, 2022 to January 2, 2023.

Following the launch of the Basingstoke small-scale DAB multiplex in November 2022, Outreach Radio, alongside their sister station, Outreach Dance, became available on DAB+ for listeners in Basingstoke and surrounding areas.

The station is currently available on mobile devices via radio streaming apps such as Radioplayer, Online Radio Box or myTuner. It is also available on Amazon Alexa and Google Home. On September 1, 2022, Outreach Radio also became the first station to be featured on the UK Radio Portal, making their service available to connected Freeview homes across all ITV Meridian regions on Freeview channel 277.

Transmitters

Digital (DAB)

Analogue (FM) [Formerly]

Presenters

Current Presenters
Osman Şen-Chadun (DJ Oz) [2020-]
Onur Şen-Chadun (The Groovy Pelican) [2020-]
Carl Maskelyne (2020-)
Matt Belsey (2020-)
Cliff Proctor "Radio Doctor" [2020-]
Andrew Kingshott (DJ Kingshott) [2020-]
Philip Petty (Pyro The Rock Monster) [2020-]
Richard Lawrence (2020-)
Georgina Foyle (Deejay GG) [2020-]
Gordon Cooper (The Rockmeister) [2020-]
Mike Joyce (The Music Man) [2021-]
Matthew & Georgette Ellison (2021-)
Colin Old (2021-)
Paul Williams (Trixxter) [2021-]
Finlay Sambrook Smith (Sambrook) [2021-]
Steve Ridout (2021-)
Ian Fisher (2021-)
Bumi Benjamin (DJ Bumi) [2021-]
Terence Mthimkhulu (Mr. Twist) [2021-]
Tamsyn Govan (Court Jester) [2022-]
Robert Green (Robin) [2022-]
Carrie Knights (2022-)
Robert "Bob" Heather (2022-)

Former Presenters
Greg Mudd
Jef Powell
Zofia Rogers
David Gates
Shaun O'Brien
Rob Stevens
Guilherme Afonso (DJ William)
Connor Gale
Iain Meadows
Rob Sawyer
Cherl "Chez" Horton-Powell
Carl Poole (DJ Mash)
Margaret "Maggie" Bligdon-Boyt
Alan Galpin
Elliot Eagleton (eegltn)

See also
Outreach Dance
Symonds Radio
Sam FM (South Coast)
Power FM
Ocean Sound
Wave 105
Win 107.2
107.4 The Quay
Isle of Wight Radio
Spirit FM (UK radio station)
Delta FM
Kestrel FM
Spire FM

References 

Radio stations in Hampshire
Radio stations in England
Mass media in Hampshire